The triangular tiling honeycomb is one of 11 paracompact regular space-filling tessellations (or honeycombs) in hyperbolic 3-space. It is called paracompact because it has infinite cells and vertex figures, with all vertices as ideal points at infinity. It has Schläfli symbol {3,6,3}, being composed of triangular tiling cells. Each edge of the honeycomb is surrounded by three cells, and each vertex is ideal with infinitely many cells meeting there. Its vertex figure is a hexagonal tiling.

Symmetry 
]

In Coxeter notation, the removal of the 3rd and 4th mirrors, [3,6,3*] creates a new Coxeter group [3[3,3]], subgroup index 6. The fundamental domain is 6 times larger. By Coxeter diagram there are 3 copies of the first original mirror in the new fundamental domain:  ↔ .

Related Tilings 

It is similar to the 2D hyperbolic infinite-order apeirogonal tiling, {∞,∞}, with infinite apeirogonal faces, and with all vertices on the ideal surface.

Related honeycombs 
The triangular tiling honeycomb is a regular hyperbolic honeycomb in 3-space, and one of eleven paracompact honeycombs.

There are nine uniform honeycombs in the [3,6,3] Coxeter group family, including this regular form as well as the bitruncated form, t1,2{3,6,3},  with all truncated hexagonal tiling facets.

The honeycomb is also part of a series of polychora and honeycombs with triangular edge figures.

Rectified triangular tiling honeycomb

The rectified triangular tiling honeycomb, has trihexagonal tiling and hexagonal tiling cells, with a triangular prism vertex figure.

Symmetry
A lower symmetry of this honeycomb can be constructed as a cantic order-6 hexagonal tiling honeycomb,  ↔ . A second lower-index construction is  ↔ .

Truncated triangular tiling honeycomb

The truncated triangular tiling honeycomb, is a lower-symmetry form of the hexagonal tiling honeycomb, . It contains hexagonal tiling facets with a tetrahedral vertex figure.

Bitruncated triangular tiling honeycomb

The bitruncated triangular tiling honeycomb, has truncated hexagonal tiling cells, with a tetragonal disphenoid vertex figure.

Cantellated triangular tiling honeycomb

The cantellated triangular tiling honeycomb, has rhombitrihexagonal tiling, trihexagonal tiling, and triangular prism cells, with a wedge vertex figure.

Symmetry
It can also be constructed as a cantic snub triangular tiling honeycomb, a half-symmetry form with symmetry [3+,6,3].

Cantitruncated triangular tiling honeycomb

The cantitruncated triangular tiling honeycomb, has truncated trihexagonal tiling, truncated hexagonal tiling, and triangular prism cells, with a mirrored sphenoid vertex figure.

Runcinated triangular tiling honeycomb

The runcinated triangular tiling honeycomb, has triangular tiling and triangular prism cells, with a hexagonal antiprism vertex figure.

Runcitruncated triangular tiling honeycomb

The runcitruncated triangular tiling honeycomb, has hexagonal tiling, rhombitrihexagonal tiling, triangular prism, and hexagonal prism cells, with an isosceles-trapezoidal pyramid vertex figure.

Symmetry
It can also be constructed as a runcicantic snub triangular tiling honeycomb, a half-symmetry form with symmetry [3+,6,3].

Omnitruncated triangular tiling honeycomb

The omnitruncated triangular tiling honeycomb, has truncated trihexagonal tiling and hexagonal prism cells, with a phyllic disphenoid vertex figure.

Runcisnub triangular tiling honeycomb

The runcisnub triangular tiling honeycomb, has trihexagonal tiling, triangular tiling, triangular prism, and triangular cupola cells. It is vertex-transitive, but not uniform, since it contains Johnson solid triangular cupola cells.

See also 
 Convex uniform honeycombs in hyperbolic space
 Regular tessellations of hyperbolic 3-space
 Paracompact uniform honeycombs

References 
Coxeter, Regular Polytopes, 3rd. ed., Dover Publications, 1973. . (Tables I and II: Regular polytopes and honeycombs, pp. 294–296)
 The Beauty of Geometry: Twelve Essays (1999), Dover Publications,  (Chapter 10, Regular Honeycombs in Hyperbolic Space) Table III
 Jeffrey R. Weeks The Shape of Space, 2nd edition  (Chapter 16-17: Geometries on Three-manifolds I,II)
 Norman Johnson Uniform Polytopes, Manuscript
 N.W. Johnson: The Theory of Uniform Polytopes and Honeycombs, Ph.D. Dissertation, University of Toronto, 1966 
 N.W. Johnson: Geometries and Transformations, (2018) Chapter 13: Hyperbolic Coxeter groups

Honeycombs (geometry)
Self-dual tilings
Triangular tilings